Brenman is a German and Ashkenazi Jewish surname. As a Yiddish spelling variant of German Brennemann (English language version: Brenneman) it is probably a variant of the family name Brenner (agent derivative of German brennen "to burn"). Notable people with the surname include:
 Greg Brenman, English film and television producer
 Ilan Brenman (born 1973), Israeli author
 Margaret Brenman-Gibson (died 2004), American psychologist and biographer
 Owen Brenman (born 1956), English actor

See also
 Brennan
 Brenneman
 Brenner (surname)

References

German-language surnames
Jewish surnames
Yiddish-language surnames